Revolutionary Socialism is a Trotskyist political party in Venezuela.  It was formerly affiliated to the Committee for a Workers' International.  The party publishes the newspaper El Militante.

Activities

Socialismo Revolucionario have organised public meeting on various issues such as one on the events surrounding the CPE in France (see 2006 labour protests in France) with over 100 in attendance.

Socialismo Revolucionario members have also helped organise the Workers Rights Campaign Venezuela and campaigned in defence of trade union rights.

Merger with Izquierda Revolucionaria
After a series of discussions and exchanges of documents a merger was agreed by Revolutionary left and the Committee for a Worker's International with Izquierda Revolucionaria and their co-thinkers in Mexico and Spain. This was agreed at a conference in Madrid on 13 April 2017 and confirmed at a conference of the CWI in Barcelona on 22 July 2017.  In Venezuela Izquierda Revolucionaria were previously known as the Revolutionary Marxist Current, the merged groups will use the name Izquierda Revolucionaria in Venezuela.

References

External links
CWI Website

Communist parties in Venezuela
Venezuela
Political parties in Venezuela
Political parties with year of establishment missing
Trotskyist organizations in Venezuela